Arabinda is an Indian given masculine name. Notable people with the name include:

Arabinda Dhali, Indian politician
Arabinda Ghosh (born 1925), Indian politician
Arabinda Muduli (born 1961), Indian musician, singer, and lyricist
Arabinda Rajkhowa (born 1956), Indian politician